Joaquín María de Ferrer y Cafranga (8 December 1777, in Pasajes de San Pedro, Spain – 30 September 1861, in Santa Águeda, Spain) was a Spanish politician and military who served as Prime Minister of Spain in 1841, and held other important offices such as Minister of State, Mayor of Madrid and President of the Senate. He also served as Deputy Prime Minister between 1840 and 1841.

References

|-

|-

Prime Ministers of Spain
Economy and finance ministers of Spain
Foreign ministers of Spain
Mayors of Madrid
1777 births
1861 deaths
Progressive Party (Spain) politicians
Deputy Prime Ministers of Spain
Presidents of the Congress of Deputies (Spain)